Dwight Gerard Walker (born January 10, 1959) is a former American football player for the Cleveland Browns and New Orleans Saints.

Dwight Walker played for the Cleveland Browns and the New Orleans Saints. He played running back for the Cleveland Browns for 3 years from 1982-1984. He was forced to retire due to injuries sustained in a car accident. His best season with the Browns was in 1983. In 1987, Walker resumed his career with the New Orleans Saints and played wide receiver before retiring again following the season. 

Walker played college football at Nicholls State University and was named first-team Associated Press All-American and first-team Kodak All-American by the American Football Coaches Association (AFCA) in 1981. He attended East Jefferson High School in Metairie, Louisiana.

References
Nicholls State Colonels media guide

External links 
Nicholls State bio
Cleveland Browns Dwight Walker
New Orleans Saints Dwight Walker
NFL bio
 Dwight Walker statistics at databasefootball.com 

Living people
1959 births
People from Metairie, Louisiana
East Jefferson High School alumni
Players of American football from Louisiana
Nicholls Colonels football players
All-American college football players
Cleveland Browns players
New Orleans Saints players
National Football League replacement players